Křelovice is a municipality and village in Pelhřimov District in the Vysočina Region of the Czech Republic. It has about 300 inhabitants.

Administrative parts
Villages of Číhovice, Jiřičky and Poříčí are administrative parts of Křelovice.

References

Villages in Pelhřimov District